Kaveh Mazaheri ((born 14 September 1981 in Tehran, Iran) is an Iranian Director and Scriptwriter.

He started his work by writing a film critique in magazines. After graduating in railway engineering from Iran University of Science and Technology in 2005, he made his first short narrative film entitled "Tweezers". He has directed four independent short narrative films and more than twenty short and medium-length documentaries.
He has won numerous awards from national and international film festivals for short film Retouch, such as "Best Short Fiction Film" at Tribeca, Kraków, Palm Springs, Stockholm, Tirana, Fajr Film Festivals

Movies

Long Films 
 Botox (2019)

Short Narrative Films 
 Tweezers (2007) 
 Cockroach (2016)
 Retouch (2017)

Documentaries 
 Waxinema (2008) 
 Day of Blood (2008)
 Soori's Trip (2010)
 A Report about Mina (2015)
 Flight to Pardis (2016)

Awards 
 Yamagata International Documentary Film Festival (Japan 2015)- Winner Jury Special Mention
 Tribeca Film Festival (USA 2017)- Winner Best Narrative Short, Winner Jury Prize
 Kraków Film Festival (Poland 2017)- Winner Best Short Fiction Film, Winner Don Quixote Award 
 Palm Springs International ShortFest (USA 2017)- Winner Best Live Action over 15 Minutes
 Fajr Film Festival (Iran 2017)-Winner Best Short Film (Crystal Simorgh Prize)
  25th Curtas Vila do Conde International Film Festival (Portugal 2017) – Winner Audience Award, Nominated Grand Prize
 Stockholm International Film Festival (Sweden 2017) – Winner Best Short Film
 Traverse City Film Festival (USA 2017) – Winner Best Short Fiction Film 
  Hancheng International Short Film Festival (China 2017) – Winner 3rd Prize for Best Short Film of Silk Road Competition
  Ojai Film Festival (USA 2017) – Winner Best Narrative Short
 Tirana International Film Festival (Albania 2017) – Winner Best Short Fiction
  Wine Country Film Festival-WCFF (USA 2017) – Winner "COURAGE IN CINEMA" AWARD
 Aix-en-Provence International Short Film Festival (France 2017) – Winner Jury Prize 
  Almería International Film Festival (Spain 2017) – Winner Best Screenplay
  Iranian Film Festival – San Francisco (USA 2017) – Winner Best Screenplay for Short Film 
  Asiana International Short Film Festival (Korea 2017) – Winner Jury Special Mention
  São Paulo International Short Film Festival (Brazil 2017) – Winner Audience Favorite Prize, Nominated Best Film
  Bosphorus International Film Festival (Turkey 2017) – Winner Best International Short Fiction Film
  International Short Film Festival ZUBROFFKA (Poland 2017) – Winner Best Film
  SETEM Academy Silk Road International Film Festival (Turkey 2017) – Winner Grand Special Jury prize
 Moscow International Film Festival (Russia 2017) – Nominated Best Film of the Short Film Competition (Silver St. George) 
 Durban International Film Festival (South Africa 2017)- Nominated Best International Short Film
 Dokufest International Documentary and Short Film Festival (Kosovo 2017) – Nominated Best Fiction Short Film
  Encounters Film Festival (UK 2017) – Nominated Best Film
 Moondance International Film Festival (USA 2017) – Nominated Best Short Film
 Denver Film Festival (USA 2017) – Nominated Best Short Film
 Tallgrass Film Festival (USA 2017) – Nominated Best Short Film
  Tacoma Film Festival (USA 2017) – Nominated Best Short Film
 Adelaide Film Festival (Australia 2017) – Nominated Best Short Film
 Sedicicorto International Film Festival (Italy 2017) – Nominated Best Short Film
 Chicago International Film Festival (USA 2017) – Nominated Gold Hugo for Best Fiction Short Film
 Valladolid International Film Festival Seminci (Spain 2017) – Nominated Best Foreign Short at Meeting Point Section

References 

https://tribecafilm.com/filmguide/retouch-2017
https://mubi.com/cast/kaveh-mazaheri
http://directorsnotes.com/2017/10/09/kaveh-mazaheri-retouch/
https://bingz.info/director/kaveh-mazaheri/
The film "Tweezers" on the short film website
Page of the film "Waxinema" on the short film website
 Reotuch 

 

1981 births
Iranian screenwriters
Iranian film directors
Iranian documentary filmmakers
Living people